Mariano Ospina  may refer to:
Presidents of Colombia

Mariano Ospina Rodríguez, president 1857–1861. 
Mariano Ospina Pérez, president 1946–1950.

See also 
Pedro Nel Ospina, president 1922–1926, son of Mariano Ospina Rodríguez